Lens is a city in the Pas-de-Calais department in northern France. It is one of the main towns of Hauts-de-France along with Lille, Valenciennes, Amiens, Roubaix, Tourcoing, Arras and Douai. The inhabitants are called Lensois.

Metropolitan area
Lens belongs to the intercommunality of Lens-Liévin, which consists of 36 communes, with a total population of 242,000. Lens, along with Douai and 65 other communes, forms the agglomeration (unité urbaine) of Douai-Lens, whose population as of 2018 was 504,281.

History
Lens was initially a fortification from the Norman invasions. In 1180, it was owned by the Count of Flanders, and sovereignty was exercised by the Crown of France. In the 13th century, Lens received a charter from Louis VIII of France, allowing it to become a city. The Flemish razed the city in 1303. Prior to this, the city's population relied on its markets. In 1526, Lens was made part of the Spanish Netherlands under the ownership of the French monarchy, and only passed back to France on 7 November 1659 with the Treaty of the Pyrenees.

In 1849, coal was discovered in Lens after surveys were carried out at Annay, Courrières and Loos-en-Gohelle. This led to the expansion of the city into an important industrial center. The Lens Mining Company was founded in 1852 and experienced large profits. The city was largely destroyed in the First World War and half of the population perished. In World War II, the Allies bombarded the city from the air, leaving 500 dead.

Approximately nine kilometres from Lens, the Canadian National Vimy Memorial was opened in 1936, dedicated to the Battle of Vimy Ridge (part of the Battle of Arras) and the First World War Canadian soldiers who died during the war; the Memorial is also the site of two Canadian cemeteries. The centennial commemoration of the Battle of Vimy Ridge was held at the Memorial on 9 April 2017. The official ceremony included comments from Canadian Prime Minister Justin Trudeau, Governor General David Johnston as representative of the Monarchy of Canada, Prince Charles as representative of the Monarchy of the United Kingdom, Prince William, Duke of Cambridge, Prince Harry, the President of France François Hollande, and the Prime Minister of France Bernard Cazeneuve.

The last coal mine in Lens closed in 1986. Since 2012, Lens has been the location of the Louvre-Lens art museum.

Population

Transport
The Lens railway station, built in 1927, is served by regional trains towards Lille, Arras, Douai, Dunkirk, Calais and Valenciennes. It is also connected to the TGV network, with high speed trains to Paris. It is served by the Lens-Béthune bus network, with bus services running across Lens and connecting it to nearby towns.

Sport

Football club RC Lens plays in the town. Their stadium, Stade Bollaert-Delelis, was used for UEFA Euro 1984, the 1998 FIFA World Cup and UEFA Euro 2016 and the 1999 Rugby World Cup and the 2007 Rugby World Cup.

Gallery

See also
 Stade Bollaert-Delelis
 Communes of the Pas-de-Calais department
 :Category:Counts of Lens
 Institut de génie informatique et industriel

References

External links

 Official web site 
 Communauté d'Agglomeration of Lens-Liévin 

 
Communes of Pas-de-Calais
Subprefectures in France
Artois